Agnès Gruda is a Polish-born Canadian journalist and fiction writer. A foreign correspondent for La Presse, she won a National Newspaper Award in 2014 for her reporting on the Salafi movement.

Her debut short story collection Onze petites trahisons was a shortlisted finalist for the Governor General's Award for French-language fiction at the 2010 Governor General's Awards, and won Quebec's Prix Adrienne-Choquette. Her second short fiction collection, Mourir, mais pas trop, was published in 2016.

She is the sister of writer Joanna Gruda and journalist Alexandra Szacka.

References

21st-century Canadian journalists
21st-century Canadian short story writers
Canadian newspaper journalists
Canadian women journalists
Canadian women short story writers
Canadian short story writers in French
Polish emigrants to Canada
Writers from Quebec
Living people
Canadian women non-fiction writers
Year of birth missing (living people)
Journalists from Montana